Ya'rub (also spelled  Yarob,Ya'rob, Yarrob, Yarab or Yaarub) is an ancient Arabic personal name. He is the grandson of Abir  being the son of Qahtan and the ancestor of the Himyarite and Sabaean kings of Yemen. A similar account places Ya'rub as Qahtan's grandson (Ya'rub bin Yashjub bin Qahtan) and holds that he is the forefather of al-'Arab al-'Ariba ("the arab arabs" or "pure arabs"), who are generally identified with the Qahtanites and its two main tribes, the Himyar and the Kahlan. Some legendary accounts relate that Ya'rub was the first to speak Arabic and that the language was named for him. Shams-i Qais Razi, writing in the 12-13th century CE, traced the origins of Arabic poetry to Ya'rub and he is also credited with having invented the Kufic script.

Ancestor of kings
Ya'rub was said to be one of greatest Arab kings; he was the first to rule the entire lands of Yemen (southwestern Arabia). He expelled or destroyed the remaining Adites (the ones who survived the destruction of their former kingdom) and consolidated the empire of Yemen, and gave to his brothers Oman and Hadhramaut. His grandson was the king Saba or Sheba, the founder of Saba or Sheba kingdom, mentioned in the Qur'an.

References

Bibliography

 

Sahabah ancestors